Maja Živec-Škulj (born 25 September 1973) is a former professional tennis player from Germany.

Biography
Živec-Škulj was born in the Slovenian city of Ljubljana, then part of Yugoslavia, but later emigrated to West Germany. 

She was a member of the West German side, along with Anke Huber and Katharina Düll, which defeated Czechoslovakia to win the Junior Fed Cup in 1989. Her junior career also included a quarter-final appearance in the girls' singles at the 1991 Australian Open and she featured as well in the women's singles main draw for the first time that year.

At the 1992 Australian Open, her first round opponent was 12th seed Anke Huber, who she managed to take a set off before losing in three. She broke into the top 100 during the 1992 season and peaked at 73 in the world early in 1993. Her best performance on the WTA Tour came at Curitaba in 1993 where she was a quarter-finalist. She competed in the main draw of both the Australian Open and Wimbledon in 1993.

As a doubles player she reached as high as 96 in the rankings. She made two WTA Tour semi-finals, at Kitzbuhel in 1993 and Beijing in 1994.

ITF finals

Singles: 9 (4–5)

Doubles: 5 (2–3)

References

External links
 
 

1973 births
Living people
German female tennis players
Yugoslav emigrants to Germany
German people of Slovenian descent
Sportspeople from Ljubljana